The Umbrian regional election of 1990 took place on 6 and 7 May 1990.

Events
The Italian Communist Party was by far the largest party, even if it lost several votes from the previous election in 1985. After the election, Francesco Mandarini, the incumbent Communist President, continued to govern the Region at the head of a left-wing coalition with the Italian Socialist Party (Popular Democratic Front).

In 1992 Mandarini was replaced by Francesco Ghirelli, to whom Claudio Carnieri succeeded in 1993. Both Ghirelli and Carnieri were members of the Democratic Party of the Left, the successor party of the Communist Party since 1991.

Results

Source: Ministry of the Interior

Elections in Umbria
1990 elections in Italy